Erythema nodosum et multiforme is a type of erythema (skin redness) and refers to:

 Erythema nodosum (EN)
 Erythema multiforme (EM)

Erythemas